Jordi Arrese i Castañé (born 29 August 1964) is a former professional tennis player from Spain.

Born in Barcelona, Arrese won the men's singles silver medal at the 1992 Olympic Games in his home town. In the final, he was defeated in a marathon five-set match by Marc Rosset of Switzerland, 7–6, 6–4, 3–6, 4–6, 8–6.

During his career, Arrese won six top-level singles and four tour doubles titles, and reached a career-high singles ranking of world No. 23.

Career finals

Singles: 12 (6 wins, 6 losses)

Doubles: 10 (4 wins, 6 losses)

External links
 
 
 

Tennis players from Catalonia
Olympic medalists in tennis
Olympic silver medalists for Spain
Olympic tennis players of Spain
Spanish male tennis players
Tennis players from Barcelona
Tennis players at the 1992 Summer Olympics
1964 births
Living people
Medalists at the 1992 Summer Olympics
20th-century Spanish people